Şentürk is a Turkish surname. Notable people with the surname include:

 Arif Şentürk (born 1941), Turkish singer of Macedonian descent
 Damla Şentürk, Turkish-American biostatistician
 Erhan Şentürk (born 1989), Turkish footballer
 Kemalettin Şentürk (born 1970), retired Turkish footballer
 Metin Şentürk (born 1966), Turkish blind pop singer
 Semih Şentürk (born 1983), Turkish footballer

Turkish-language surnames